Sheikh Saud bin Rashid Al Mualla (born 1 October 1952; referred to as Sheikh Saud) is the ruler and head of state of the emirate of Umm Al Quwain since 2009 and a member of the Federal Supreme Council of the United Arab Emirates. 

He is the son of Rashid bin Ahmad Al Mualla II and succeeded his father as monarch of Umm Al Quwain on 2 January 2009.

Early life and education
Born on 1 October 1952, Sheikh Saud received his elementary and primary education in Umm Al Quwain before attending high school in Lebanon. He graduated with a degree in economics from Cairo University, Egypt in 1974.

Political career
Sheikh Saud was the Commander of the Umm Al Quwain National Guard with the rank of colonel. In 1989 he headed the Umm Al Quwain Royal Court (Al Diwan Al-Amir). Then, on 22 June 1972, his father Sheikh Rashid bin Ahmad Al Mualla II designated him to be the Crown Prince of Umm Al Quwain. He assisted his father in managing the emirate's affairs, oversaw many investment projects and established numerous government entities and local enterprises.

He was appointed to the United Arab Emirates foreign ministry in 1973 and seconded at the Umm Al Quwain Amiri court. He was appointed Commander of the Umm Al Quwain Amiri guard in 1977. In 1979, he was appointed chief of the Umm Al Quwain Amiri court (Diwan) and became crown prince in 1982.

See also
 Al Ali

References

1952 births
Living people
Sheikhs of Umm Al Quwain
History of the United Arab Emirates
20th-century Emirati people